Venkataraman Bhaskar (born 18 March 1969) is an Indian economist and Sue Killam Professor of Economics at the University of Texas at Austin.

Career
Bhaskar received his BA from Madras University and his MA from Jawaharlal Nehru University and completed his doctoral studies at Oxford University.

He has previously taught at University College London (2005-2014), University of Essex (1998-2005), St. Andrews University (1995-1998) and the Delhi School of Economics (1989-1995). 
Bhaskar is known for his works on microeconomic theory and industrial organization.

Books
 The North, the South and the Environment, edited  with Andrew Glyn, Earthscan (London), February 1995
 Oxford Review of Economic Policy (Special Issue on India), edited with Bishnupriya Gupta, June 2007

References

Living people
Indian economists
University of Texas at Austin faculty
Academics of University College London
1969 births
Jawaharlal Nehru University alumni
University of Madras alumni
Alumni of the University of Oxford
Academics of the University of Essex
Academics of the University of St Andrews
Academic staff of Delhi University